Ram Sharma (1837–1918) was a nineteenth-century Indo-Anglian poet who alternately criticized and praised the government in his poems and newspaper articles. He began his literary career in the 1860s but pursued steady writing only after his retirement from a government post in 1878. He practiced Yoga for 40 years.

Poetry
His poem, Ode on The Meeting of Congress at Allahabad, on 26 December 1888 was considered one of his most powerful poems. Some of his other poems are:
 Willow Drops, published 1874-75
 Our Greetings to His Royal Highness Albert Victor of Wales, which first brought him to prominence
 Siva Ratri, which has similarities to Bunyan's Pilgrim's Progress
 Bhagobati Gita, a Keatsian expression of Ram Sharma's mystical perceptions
 The Last Day, a dream fantasy, together with Siva Ratri and Bhagobati Gita are the most expressive of Ram Sharma's genius and talent.
 Unheard Melodies, a fluent and elegant expression of his deeper spiritual experiences
 Mohinee
 Stanzas to Lord Lytton's Infant Son
 Song of the Indian Conservative
 To Our Pseudo-social Reformers
 India's Welcome---To Mr Bradlaugh and Her Other English Friends
 India to Britain
 To England 
 The Jolly Beggars
 In Memoriam: Michael Madhusudan Dutt and A Prayer.

References

External links
Early Indian Poetry in English: An Anthology: 1829-1947/edited by Eunice De Souza. New Delhi, Oxford University Press, 2005, xxxi, 341 p., .

1837 births
Poets in British India
English-language poets from India
1918 deaths
Indian male poets
19th-century Indian poets
20th-century Indian poets
19th-century British male writers
20th-century Indian male writers